Round Lake is a natural freshwater lake on the south side of Winter Haven, Florida. It is bordered on the north, east and southeast by houses in a gated community. On the south is a grass field, beyond which is Eloise Loop Road, and on the west and southwest is a citrus grove. This lake is swampy on much of its shore and there are ten or so minuscule islets along the shore.

Round Lake is completely surrounded by private property, which means the public needs to obtain permission to access the lake for fishing. There are no swimming beaches on the lake and only private boat and fishing docks. The Hook and Bullet website always lists the types of fish in lakes whether or not there is free public access to them. The website says this lake contains a large variety of fish. This website lists pumpkinseed, bluegill, yellow perch, bowfin, warmouth, gar, catfish (bullhead), green sunfish, carp, largemouth bass, crappie and rock bass.

References

Lakes of Polk County, Florida